The Craft–Clausen House is a historic stone house located at 170 Fairmont Road in Washington Township, Morris County, New Jersey. It was added to the National Register of Historic Places on May 1, 1992, for its significance in architecture. The house is part of the Stone Houses and Outbuildings in Washington Township Multiple Property Submission (MPS).

History
John Craft bought the property here in 1848 and likely built the house soon after. The property was then sold to William Clausen in 1869. The next owner was Walter Parley in 1924.

Description
The house is a -story stone building with a gable roof and Victorian architecture details. It was enlarged in 1924 with a small frame addition. The property also includes two outbuildings: a wagon house and a chicken coop.

See also
 National Register of Historic Places listings in Morris County, New Jersey

References

External links
 

Washington Township, Morris County, New Jersey
National Register of Historic Places in Morris County, New Jersey
Houses on the National Register of Historic Places in New Jersey
New Jersey Register of Historic Places
Houses in Morris County, New Jersey
Stone houses in New Jersey
Mid 19th Century Revival architecture in the United States